SM UB-116 was a German Type UB III submarine or U-boat in the German Imperial Navy during World War I. She was commissioned into the German Imperial Navy on 24 May 1918 as SM UB-116.

According to Uboat.net, UB-116 hit a mine and was next finished off by depth charges while trying to reach the empty Scapa anchorage. All hands were lost (36 sailors).

Construction

She was built by Blohm & Voss of Hamburg and following just under a year of construction, launched at Hamburg on 4 November 1917. UB-116 was commissioned in the spring the next year under the command of Oblt.z.S. Erich Stephan. Like all Type UB III submarines, UB-116 carried 10 torpedoes and was armed with a  deck gun. UB-116 had a displacement of  while surfaced and  when submerged. Her engines enabled her to travel at  when surfaced and  when submerged.

References

Notes

Citations

Bibliography 

 

German Type UB III submarines
World War I submarines of Germany
U-boats commissioned in 1918
1917 ships
Ships built in Hamburg
U-boats sunk in 1918
U-boats sunk by mines
Maritime incidents in 1918
World War I shipwrecks in the North Sea
Ships lost with all hands